Sir Joseph Donaldson Cantley,  (8 August 1910 – 6 January 1993) was an English barrister and later a High Court judge.  He is most notable for presiding over the trial of Jeremy Thorpe in 1979.

Early life
Cantley was born in Manchester, where his father was a general practitioner.  He was educated at Manchester Grammar School and then studied law at Manchester University.  He was called to the bar at Middle Temple in 1933, and came top in his bar finals examination, gaining first-class honours and the Certificate of Honour.

Legal career
He became a barrister in Manchester, with a pupillage under Denis Gerrard and then practising on the Northern Circuit.

Cantley served in the British Army in the Second World War, first in the Royal Artillery and then on staff appointments, spending time in North Africa and Italy.  He was appointed an Officer of the Order of the British Empire (OBE) in 1945, and was demobilised as a lieutenant colonel.

He returned to the bar after the war.  He had a mixed practice, specialising in contract law cases.  He became a Queen's Counsel in 1954, and a Bencher at Middle Temple in 1963.  He served as Treasurer at Middle Temple in 1981.

One of his last trials was leading for the prosecution when Gwynne Evans and Peter Allen were convicted for the murder of John Alan West in 1964, which led to the last two judicial executions in Britain before the abolition of the death penalty in 1965.

Judicial career
Cantley became Judge of the Court of Record in the Hundred of Salford in Lancashire in 1960, and was Judge of Appeal in the Isle of Man High Court from 1962 to 1965.  He was appointed as a High Court judge in 1965, allocated to the Queen's Bench Division, and received the customary knighthood.

He was Presiding Judge on the Northern Circuit from 1970 to 1974.  He had a low public profile until he presided at the trial of Jeremy Thorpe in May–June 1979, shortly after the 1979 UK general election on 3 May 1979 - so much so that no press agency could find a photograph of him. Thorpe was acquitted, and Cantley's summing up roundly condemned the prosecution witnesses and praised the defendants, while claiming not to express an opinion.

At the 1979 Secret Policeman's Ball, in aid of Amnesty International, the biased summing up speech by Mr Justice Cantley was parodied by Peter Cook. The sketch was written and delivered shortly after the trial and was, according to Freeman and Penrose, "actually not that different from the original." The nine-minute opus, "Entirely a Matter for You", is considered to be one of the finest works of Cook's career. Cook and show producer Martin Lewis brought out an album on Virgin Records entitled Here Comes the Judge: Live of the live performance together with three studio tracks that further lampooned the Thorpe trial.  Notwithstanding marked and widespread public disquiet at the biased summing-up in the Thorpe trial, Cantley was considered as Presiding Judge on the South Eastern Circuit, but declined in order to become Treasurer of Middle Temple in 1981.

Personal life and death
Cantley married Hilda Goodwin Gerrard (née Jones) in 1966, widow of his former pupil-master, Albert Denis Gerrard. He retired from the bench in 1985. In later life, he lived with his wife in the Temple and attended the Temple Church.

Cantley died in London on 6 January 1993 following several years of ill health, aged 82. His wife Hilda died on 11 September 1995, aged 95.

References

 Obituary, The Independent, 9 January 1993
 Portrait, National Portrait Gallery
 History's Greatest Scandals, Ed Wright, p. 76, 2011, 
 Our Corrupt Legal System, Evan Whitton, p. 147, 2010, 

1910 births
1993 deaths
Queen's Bench Division judges
Lawyers from Manchester
People educated at Manchester Grammar School
Alumni of the University of Manchester
Members of the Middle Temple
Royal Artillery officers
British Army personnel of World War II
Officers of the Order of the British Empire
20th-century British lawyers
Knights Bachelor
20th-century English lawyers